This is a list of violent incidents in Pakistan from 2006 to 2009. Violence increased in 2006, in part because the US/NATO strategy from 2005 of attacking the Taliban in their stronghold in South Afghanistan (including Helmand), lead to incidents on the Pakistani side of the border.

See also
 War in North-West Pakistan
 Civilian casualties
 List of terrorist incidents in Pakistan since 2001
 Drone attacks in Pakistan by the United States

References

Conflicts in 2008
Airstrikes
2006 in Pakistan
2007 in Pakistan
2008 in Pakistan
2009 in Pakistan
Pakistan Army
Insurgency in Khyber Pakhtunkhwa
Violence in Pakistan